Stigmella carpinella is a moth of the family Nepticulidae. It is found in from Sweden to Belgium, the Alps, Croatia and Bulgaria, and from Great Britain to Ukraine.

The wingspan is 5–6 mm. Adults are on wing at the end of April.

The larvae feed on Carpinus betulus, Carpinus orientalis and Ostrya carpinifolia. They mine the leaves of their host plant. The mine consists of a rather broad corridor. The first part is mostly filled with frass. Later it is found in thick lumps. The trajectory of the mine is not angular, neither is it determined by the leaf venation.

External links
Fauna Europaea
bladmineerders.nl

Nepticulidae
Moths of Europe
Moths described in 1862